Javier Menghini (born 27 February 1980 in La Plata, Argentina) is a retired Argentine footballer who played as defender.

Playing career

Club
Everton
 Primera División de Chile (1): 2008 Apertura

Alki Larnaca
 Cypriot Second Division (1): 2009–10

Villa San Carlos
 Primera B Metropolitana (1): 2012–13

External links
 Javier Menghini at BDFA.com.ar 
 Soccerway Profile
 

1980 births
Living people
Footballers from La Plata
Argentine footballers
Argentine expatriate footballers
Argentine expatriate sportspeople in Chile
Argentine people of Italian descent
Association football defenders
Estudiantes de La Plata footballers
Club Atlético Platense footballers
Defensa y Justicia footballers
Godoy Cruz Antonio Tomba footballers
Alki Larnaca FC players
Enosis Neon Paralimni FC players
Everton de Viña del Mar footballers
Chilean Primera División players
Argentine Primera División players
Cypriot First Division players
Cypriot Second Division players
Expatriate footballers in Chile
Expatriate footballers in Cyprus